Agara  is a panchayat village in the southern state of Karnataka, India. It is located in the Mulbagal Taluka of Kolar district in Karnataka. There is another village named "Agara" in the Tayalur gram panchayat of Mulbagal Taluka: Agara, Tayalur.

Divisions
The Agara gram panchayat governs six villages:
 Agara
 Koladevi
 Kondenahalli
 Mandikal
 Murakanakunte
 S. Bisanahalli

See also
 Kolar

References

External links
 http://Kolar.nic.in/

Villages in Kolar district